Spittal-on-Rule is a farm in the council area of Scottish Borders in Scotland. As the name suggests it is situated on the river Rule Water, and the Spittal-on-Rule bridge crosses the Rule. More specifically, it lies where Rule Water meets the River Teviot.

History
The name Spittal means 'hospital'; this was the location of a medieval leprosy hospital, as well as a chapel and graveyard. Before the existence of this hospital, the place was known as Rulemouth.

Notable residents
 William Veitch FRSE (1794-1885) classical scholar, was born and raised here.

References

Villages in the Scottish Borders